"The Ultimate Melody" is a science fiction short story by  British writer Arthur C. Clarke, first published in 1957. The story describes the work of a physiologist who attempts to discover the connections between music and the rhythms of the electrical pulses in the brain. He believed that all "hit-tunes" were merely poor reflections of an "ultimate" melody, and he built a machine to search for this tune. By the end of the story, he succeeds, but the influence of the melody is so powerful that he becomes completely catatonic.

The piece was later published as the sixth story in Clarke's collection Tales from the White Hart.

References

External links 
 

Short stories by Arthur C. Clarke
1957 short stories
Tales from the White Hart